Midnight Sun is an album by jazz saxophonist Lou Donaldson, recorded for the Blue Note  label in 1960, but not released until 1980 and performed by Donaldson with pianist Horace Parlan, bassist George Tucker, drummer  Al Harewood and congalero Ray Barretto.

Reception
The album was awarded 3 stars in an Allmusic review by Stephen Thomas Erlewine who states "Midnight Sun is as strong as any of the hard bop records Donaldson released in the early '60s. Part of the reason the quality is so high is the fact his supporting quartet is so strong... Any dedicated Donaldson fan should search for this record; even if it doesn't reach the heights of Blues Walk and Here 'Tis, it still has plenty of fine music.

Track listing 
All compositions by Lou Donaldson except as indicated

 "Candy" (Mack David, Alex Kramer, Joan Whitney) - 6:12
 "Midnight Sun" (Sonny Burke, Lionel Hampton, Johnny Mercer) - 5:45
 "Avalon" (Buddy DeSylva, Al Jolson, Vincent Rose) - 5:18
 "The Squirrel" (Tadd Dameron) - 3:22
 "Si Si Safronia" - 4:31
 "Exactly Like You" (Dorothy Fields, Jimmy McHugh) - 5:03
 "Dog Walk" - 4:25

Personnel 
 Lou Donaldson - alto saxophone
 Horace Parlan - piano
 George Tucker - bass
 Al Harewood - drums
 Ray Barretto - congas (tracks 1 & 3-7)

References 

Lou Donaldson albums
1980 albums
Blue Note Records albums
Albums produced by Alfred Lion
Albums recorded at Van Gelder Studio